Charles Fergus Buchan Scott (born 13 October 1999) is an English former first-class cricketer.

Scott was born at Hemel Hempstead in October 1999. He was educated at St Albans School, before going up to Durham University. While studying at Durham, he played two first-class cricket matches for Durham MCCU against Durham and Northamptonshire in 2019. He scored 40 runs in his two matches, with a high score of 32. In addition to playing first-class cricket, Scott has also played minor counties cricket for Hertfordshire. His brother, George, plays first-class cricket at county level.

References

External links

1999 births
Living people
sportspeople from Hemel Hempstead
People educated at St Albans School, Hertfordshire
Alumni of Durham University
English cricketers
Durham MCCU cricketers
Hertfordshire cricketers